Highclere railway station was a station on the Didcot, Newbury and Southampton Railway in England. It shares the name of the nearby village of Highclere and Highclere Castle.

Facilities
The station was very similar to other stations on the line with the standard passing loop, station building and a single siding to the south. To the north of the station the line was crossed on an unusually designed bridge by the A34 road.

The site today
The road now occupies much of the track-bed to the south of the station, a move that took place when the trunk road became a dual carriageway. The A34 Newbury bypass now occupies the Tothill cutting which carried the line to the north of the station. The station building, goods shed, and signal box still remain to this day.

Routes

References

Further reading
  . The author spent his childhood around the station and makes extensive reference to it.

Disused railway stations in Hampshire
Former Great Western Railway stations
Railway stations in Great Britain opened in 1885
Railway stations in Great Britain closed in 1942
Railway stations in Great Britain opened in 1943
Railway stations in Great Britain closed in 1960